The 1st constituency of Indre-et-Loire is one of five French legislative constituencies in the Indre-et-Loire département.

Geography 
The constituency is centred on the city of Tours.

Deputies

Election Results

2022

 
 
 
 
 
 
 
 
|-
| colspan="8" bgcolor="#E9E9E9"|
|-

2017

2012

References

1
Tours, France